Igor Aleksovski (born 24 February 1995) is a Macedonian professional footballer who plays as a goalkeeper for Rabotnichki in the First Macedonian Football League.

Career

Club career
Aleksovski made his senior football debut on 4 August 2013 at the age of 18, by playing the full match for Makedonija G.P. against Vardar in the first round of the 2013–14 Macedonian First Football League. That season, he went on to play 31 games, missing only the last two rounds.

International
Ever since 2012 Aleksovski has been regular at most of North Macedonia's national youth teams.

He made his debut for North Macedonia national football team on 22 October 2022 in a friendly match against Saudi Arabia.

References

External links
 
 

1995 births
Living people
Association football goalkeepers
Macedonian footballers
North Macedonia youth international footballers
North Macedonia under-21 international footballers
North Macedonia international footballers
FK Rabotnički players
Macedonian First Football League players